Damiano Lestingi (born 22 April 1989) is an Italian swimmer.

Biography
He competed in the 2008 Summer Olympics.

Achievements

References

External links
 

1989 births
Living people
People from Civitavecchia
Italian male freestyle swimmers
Italian male backstroke swimmers
Olympic swimmers of Italy
Swimmers at the 2008 Summer Olympics
Mediterranean Games gold medalists for Italy
Mediterranean Games silver medalists for Italy
Mediterranean Games bronze medalists for Italy
Swimmers at the 2013 Mediterranean Games
Mediterranean Games medalists in swimming
Competitors at the 2015 Summer Universiade
Sportspeople from the Metropolitan City of Rome Capital
21st-century Italian people